Hsu Chia-wei (born 12 September 2000) is a Taiwanese race walker. He holds the national record of 10,000 metres of Taiwan race walking, currently a student at the National Taiwan University of Sport.

Competitions

References

External links 
 
 

2000 births
Living people
Male racewalkers
Taiwanese male athletes